

Events 
August 10 – A precursor of the Royal Artillery Mounted Band makes its first recorded appearance at the Battle of St. Quentin with "".
Hoste da Reggio replaces Simon Boyleau as maestro di cappella at Milan Cathedral.

Publications 
Martin Agricola – Melodiae scholasticae sub horarum intervallis decantandae (Wittenberg: Georg Rhau), music used at the Protestant school in Magdeburg, published posthumously
Jacques Arcadelt – 3 Masses (Paris: Le Roy & Ballard)
Filippo Azzaiolo (published anonymously) – , for four voices (Venice: Antonio Gardano)
Jacob Clemens non Papa
Second book of masses:  for four voices (Leuven: Pierre Phalèse), published posthumously
Third book of masses:   for four voices (Leuven: Pierre Phalèse), published posthumously
Fourth book of masses:  for five voices (Leuven: Pierre Phalèse), published posthumously
Fifth book of masses:  for five voices (Leuven: Pierre Phalèse), published posthumously
Sixth book of masses:  for five voices (Leuven: Pierre Phalèse), published posthumously
 IIII for three voices (Antwerp: Tielman Susato), settings of Psalms and other hymns in Dutch, published posthumously
Pierre Clereau –  for four voices (Paris: Nicolas Du Chemin)
Claude Goudimel – Third book of psalms for four and five voices (Paris: Le Roy & Ballard)
Jacobus de Kerle – Motets for four and five voices (Rome: Valerio Dorico)
Orlande de Lassus – Second book of madrigals for five voices (Rome: Antoine Barré)
Jean Maillard
 for eight voices (Paris: Le Roy & Ballard), a setting of the Credo
 for five voices (Paris: Le Roy & Ballard)
Jan Nasco
Canzonas and madrigals for six voices (Venice: Antonio Gardano)
Second book of madrigals for five voices (Venice: Antonio Gardano)
Dominique Phinot –  for four voices (Paris: Nicolas du Chemin)
Francesco Portinaro – Third book of madrigals for five and six voices (Venice: Antonio Gardano), also includes dialogs for seven and eight voices
Cipriano de Rore
Second Book of Madrigals in Four Parts
Fourth Book of Madrigals in Five Parts

Classical music

Births 
February 15 – Alfonso Fontanelli, composer, writer and nobleman (died 1622)
September 16 – Jacques Mauduit, composer (died 1627)
date unknown – Giovanni Croce, composer (died 1609)
probable – Thomas Morley, composer, theorist, editor and organist (died 1602)

Deaths 
April 21 – Girolamo Parabosco, composer, organist and poet (born 1524)
probable
Thomas Crecquillon, Franco-Flemish composer (born 1505)
Nicholas Ludford, composer of masses (born c.1485)

References

 
Music
16th century in music
Music by year